Little Vermilion River may refer to the following rivers in Illinois, U.S.:

 Little Vermilion River (Illinois River tributary)
 Little Vermilion River (Wabash River tributary)

See also 
 Vermilion (disambiguation)
 Vermillion River (disambiguation)